Gaius Sulpicius Galba was a Roman senator, who was active during the reign of Augustus. He was suffect consul in 5 BC as the colleague of Quintus Haterius, succeeding Lucius Vinicius.

Galba was the son of historian Gaius Sulpicius Galba, son of Servius Sulpicius Galba, a praetor in 54 BC and conspirator against Julius Caesar. His younger brother was also called Servius Sulpicius Galba. Galba was twice married. His first wife was Mummia Achaica, with whom he had two sons, Gaius consul in AD 22, and Servius, the future emperor Galba. His second wife was Livia Ocellina.

References

 James H. Oliver, "C. Sulpicius Galba, Proconsul of Achaia", American Journal of Archaeology, 46 (1942), pp. 380-388 

1st-century BC Romans
Suffect consuls of Imperial Rome
Gaius